Greece competed at the 1936 Winter Olympics in Garmisch-Partenkirchen, Germany.  It was the first time that the nation sent athletes to compete in the Winter Olympic Games.  Greek athletes have competed in every Summer Olympic Games.

Alpine skiing

Men

Cross-country skiing

Men

References

 Olympic Winter Games 1936, full results by sports-reference.com

Nations at the 1936 Winter Olympics
1936
Olympics, Winter